Jasminaldehyde (also known as jasmine aldehyde and α-pentylcinnamaldehyde) is a fine chemical used as an aroma compound in perfumes. It is responsible for jasmine's characteristic scent.

Synthesis
Jasminaldehyde used in industry is commonly derived not from jasmine essential oil, but ultimately from the castor bean plant. The process starts with ricinoleic acid, the principal constituent of castor oil. This compound undergoes cracking to undecylenic acid (used mainly to produce Nylon 11) and heptanal. The heptanal, once distilled, is then reacted with benzaldehyde in the presence of a basic catalyst (trans-aldol condensation) to give jasminaldehyde and water. The foul-smelling 2-pentylnon-2-enal is an unwanted byproduct that results from the self-condensation of heptanal.  This process parallels the preparation hexyl cinnamaldehyde from octanal and benzaldehyde.

References 

Aldehydes
Perfume ingredients